Delfina Frers Serralunga Langhi (born June 25, 1960) is an Argentine racing driver. She has competed multiple times in the TC 2000 Championship. Since retiring from racing in 2010, she serves as the general manager of the Xirayas de San Luis–OPW women's cycling team.

Frers was born in Buenos Aires in 1960 to Germán Frers Jr and Delfina Serralunga Pes. She competed as a racing driver from 1994 until 2010. She competed in forty-three races. Since her retirement, she has become involved in Argentine politics. She also serves as the sports director for the Argentine Women's Tour and the general manager of Xirayas de San Luis–OPW.

She is married to Eduardo Blaquier and has three children. Her daughter, Delfina Blaquier, was a competitive track & field athlete.

References 

Living people
1960 births
Argentine racing drivers
Blaquier family
Frers family
Racing drivers from Buenos Aires
TC 2000 Championship drivers
Argentine female racing drivers